The 1976 United States Senate election in Mississippi was held on November 2, 1976. Incumbent Democratic U.S. Senator John C. Stennis won re-election to his sixth term.

Because Stennis was unopposed in the general election, his victory in the June 1 primary was tantamount to election.

Democratic primary

Candidates
 E. Michael Marks, Jackson attorney
John C. Stennis, incumbent U.S. Senator

Results

General election

Results

See also 
 1976 United States Senate elections

References 

Single-candidate elections
1976
Mississippi
1976 Mississippi elections